"Hocus-Pocus and Frisby" is episode 95 (season 3, number 30) of the American television anthology series The Twilight Zone.

Opening narration

Plot
Somerset Frisby has a general store/gas station in a small town, and the townsfolk know him well for the tall tales he spins of his experiences, from his heroism in war to his inventions to his advice to presidents and captains of industry, all of which he fabricates. His friends gather in the store to hear him spin his stories, which they find very entertaining, and he often accompanies himself on harmonica.

That evening, as he is alone at closing time, creatures from another planet lure him into their clutches while disguised as humans, then abduct him to their spaceship. They want to add Frisby to their collection of specimens from other planets. The aliens, who accept his tales at face value, have heard Frisby claim eight doctoral degrees, so they want him as the outstanding example of the human race. Ignoring his plea that he is late for supper, the aliens insist that Frisby accompany them to their planet.

Frisby pleads that he is simply a shameless liar, but the aliens have no concept of lying, and ask him to just sit quietly and wait for departure. Unable to persuade the aliens to release him, Frisby decides to try to relax by playing his harmonica, and makes the unexpected discovery that the sound is extremely painful to the aliens, who call the notes "death sounds". After two or three aliens are rendered senseless by the harmonica, the remaining ones permit Frisby to escape. Running back to the general store, he finds his friends waiting to throw him a surprise party; in the evening's excitement, he had forgotten that it is his birthday. When he tries to tell them what happened, they enjoy a laugh at what they take to be another of Frisby's tall tales.

Nicknames
Mr. Frisby often mentions nicknames that he supposedly has received, which pertain to his tall tales. These nicknames include (ordered as mentioned):

 "Ol' Infilatin' Frisby"
 "Old Cumulus Frisby"
 "Ol' Archimedes Frisby"
 "Rear-Engine" and "Ol' Rear-Engine Frisby"
 "Stonewall Frisby" and "Stony"
 "Ol' Rocket Sauce Frisby"
 "Old Liquid Propellant Frisby"
 "Ol' Mile-A-Minute Frisby"

For his 63rd birthday, Mr. Frisby received a trophy from his friends, declaring him to be the "World's Greatest Liar".

Closing narration

References
DeVoe, Bill. (2008). Trivia from The Twilight Zone. Albany, GA: Bear Manor Media. 
Grams, Martin. (2008). The Twilight Zone: Unlocking the Door to a Television Classic. Churchville, MD: OTR Publishing. 
 Zicree, Marc Scott. The Twilight Zone Companion, Bantam Books, 1982.

External links

1962 American television episodes
The Twilight Zone (1959 TV series season 3) episodes
Television episodes about alien visitations
Television episodes written by Rod Serling
Television shows based on short fiction